"Génération 78" is a song by French singer Dalida featuring French singer Bruno Guillain. It's a megamix of Dalida's previous hits, remixed in disco style, including a new piece written by Jeff Barnel that permeates throughout the song. First released on single in March 1978, it soon became #1 hit in France and achieved success in Europe and Canada.

Dalida was a pioneer in this field, as “Génération 78” is one of the first megamixes, and one of the first commercially successful remixes in history. It was soon followed by her second megamix "Ça me fait rêver", as well successful.

"Génération 78" was immediately featured with promotional video. Commercially distributed and repeatedly played, it is one of the earliest examples of what will become music video. It is often credited in France as the first French music clip.

Description 

The idea came from Dalida's team. Seventeen-year-old Bruno Guillain was already known to the public as a new actor. It was his first of only two collaborations with Dalida in the studio, the second being for "Ça me fait rêver".

Samples 

A number of Dalida's previously released songs was sampled. They were all successes, so the song is reminiscent of a medley.

 Come prima
 Gondolier
 Volare
 Romantica
 J'attendrai
 Darla dirladada
 Paroles, paroles
 Les enfants du Pirée
 Ciao ciao bambina
 T'aimer follement
 Le jour où la pluie viendra
 Les gitans
 Gigi l'amoroso
 Il venait d'avoir 18 ans
 Bambino
 Salma Ya Salama

References

Bibliography 

External links 

 Dalida Official Website "Discography" section

Dalida songs
1978 songs
Disco songs